Orléans station (French: Gare d'Orléans) is a railway station serving the city Orléans, Loiret department, central France. It is situated on the Paris–Bordeaux railway. The Gare d'Orléans is a terminus station, and therefore TGV and most other long-distance trains only serve the nearby Les Aubrais station.

Services

The station is served by regional trains (TER Centre-Val de Loire) to Tours, Blois, Vierzon and Paris.

References

Railway stations in Loiret
Buildings and structures in Orléans
Railway stations in France opened in 1843
Transport in Orléans